Rebordões is a civil parish in the Santo Tirso Municipality located three kilometres northeast of the municipal seat of Santo Tirso. The population in 2011 was 3,368, in an area of 4.21 km².

History
There are many theories about the parish's origin and its toponymic name, but most accept that the settlement was formed in the Middle Ages by a group of peasants from Santo Tirso. Arriving in an area full of wild chestnuts (the rebordão), the area began to be referred to as Rebordões.

Although not a citizen of the community, the celebrated painter Francisco José Resende (1825–1893) was known to have lived in the area of Santosinhos. Professor at the Academy of Arts in Porto, he filled much of his artwork with scenes of the local community.

Notable citizens
 Joaquim Ferreira da Silva (born 1916), lieutenant and military chaplain, born to a long line of religious families that included one bishop, four priests and four nuns, he received a military service medal, for his service in Portuguese India;
 Armindo Araújo (born 1 September 1977) is a rally driver, responsible for winning the Production World Rally Championship two successive years (2009–2010), becoming the first pilot to receive this honour since its creation in 2002.

References

Freguesias of Santo Tirso